The British Museum is a museum of human culture and history located in Bloomsbury, London.

British Museum may also refer to:
 British Museum (Natural History), the former name of the Natural History Museum, London, used until 1992
 British Museum tube station, a London Underground station that closed in 1933
 The British Museum Is Falling Down, 1965 novel by British author David Lodge
 The British Museum Friends, charitable organisation in the United Kingdom 
 British Museum algorithm, finding the correct answer by trying all possibilities

See also

:Category:Lists of museums in the United Kingdom